Theodor Heinrich Engelbrecht (6 October 1853 – 18 October 1934) was a German agronomist, geographer, farmer and politician.

Biography 

He was born in Obendeich (near Glückstadt), in Schleswig-Holstein. He acquired his education at the universities of Leipzig and Strasbourg, and in 1911 received the honorary degree of doctor from the University of Breslau. In 1895 he joined the Prussian House of Representatives as a member of the Free Conservative Party.

Works 
 Die Landbauzonen der aussertropischen Länder (3 vols., 1899), a work on the study of agriculture in Europe
 Die geographische Verteilung der Getreidepreise (“Geographic distribution of grain prices,” 2 vols., 1908), the first volume dealing with the United States, the second with India
 Bodenbau und Viehstand in Schleswig-Holstein (1905)

References 

1853 births
1934 deaths
People from Glückstadt
German geographers
19th-century geographers
20th-century geographers
19th-century agronomists
20th-century agronomists
Leipzig University alumni
University of Strasbourg alumni
Free Conservative Party politicians
Members of the Prussian House of Representatives
German farmers